Brendan Augustine (born 26 October 1971 in East London) is a South African former football player. He played professionally for Bush Bucks, LASK Linz (Austria) and Ajax Cape Town.

He played for South Africa national soccer team and was a participant at the 1997 FIFA Confederations Cup, 1998 African Cup of Nations and 1998 FIFA World Cup. In the latter, Augustine was sent home, along with Naughty Mokoena for breaches of discipline after breaking curfew set by coach Philippe Troussier.

Career statistics

International goals

References

External links

1971 births
Living people
South African soccer players
South African expatriate soccer players
South Africa international soccer players
1997 FIFA Confederations Cup players
1998 FIFA World Cup players
1998 African Cup of Nations players
LASK players
Cape Coloureds
Cape Town Spurs F.C. players
Expatriate footballers in Austria
Sportspeople from East London, Eastern Cape
Association football wingers
Soccer players from the Eastern Cape